Charles Wharton Stork (12 February  1881 – 22 May 1971) was an American literary author, poet, and translator.

Life 

Charles Wharton Stork was born in Philadelphia on 12 February 1881 to Theophilus Baker and Hannah (Wharton) Stork. He graduated from Haverford College and Harvard University and taught in the Department of English at the University of Pennsylvania. He died in Philadelphia on 22 May 1971.

On 5 August 1908 he married Elisabeth von Pausinger, daughter of Franz Xaver von Pausinger, artist, of Salzburg, Austria. They had a daughter, Rosalie (Stork) Regen, and three sons, Francis Wharton, George Frederick, and Carl Alexander. In 1939, Stork was a survivor of the sinking of the SS Athenia in the Atlantic Ocean.

He wrote poems such as Beauty's Burden, Death - Divination and The Silent Folk. He translated the hymn "We Worship Thee, Almighty Lord" by Johan Olof Wallin, and some of the songs of Carl Michael Bellman. He is known to have disliked modernist literature.

His translations of the Swedish poet Gustaf Fröding were harshly criticized in reviews by Svea Bernhard and Ernst W. Olson but generally praised in an article by Axel J. Uppvall, who along with Olson had also rendered Fröding's poems into English.

Stork and his British contemporary, C. D. Locock,  published several volumes of Swedish poetry in translation. Among the authors they covered were Gustaf Fröding, Erik Axel Karlfeldt, Birger Sjöberg and August Strindberg.

Works 
 Day Dreams of Greece, 1909
 The Queen of Orplede, 1910
 Sea and Bay: A Poem of New England, 1916
 Alcibiades, 1967

Translations 
The Master of Palmyra, dramatic poem, 1914
 Gustaf Fröding: Selected Poems Translated from the Swedish, (New York: Macmillan, 1916)
 Anthology of Swedish Lyrics, 1750-1915 (New York: The American-Scandinavian Foundation, 1917) (including some of Bellman's Epistles and Songs)
The Lyrical Poems of Hugo Von Hofmannsthal, 1918
Sweden’s Laureate: Selected Poems of Verner Von Heidenstam, 1919
The Charles Men, Pts. 1-2, historical fiction, 1920
Modern Swedish masterpieces, short stories, 1923
The Dragon and the Foreign Devils, non-fiction, 1928
Martin Birck’s Youth, novel, 1930
Short Stories of Hjalmar Söderberg, 1935
Arcadia Borealis, poems of Erik Axel Karlfeldt, 1938
The Tales of Ensign Stål, poems of J. L. Runeberg, 1938
Anthology of Norwegian Lyrics, 1942
A Second Book of Danish Verse, 1947

References

External links 

   
 Poetry Foundation: Poems by Charles Wharton Stork

1881 births
1971 deaths
American translators
Harvard University alumni
Haverford College alumni
Poets from Pennsylvania
University of Pennsylvania faculty
Wharton family
20th-century translators